The FAI Cup 1925-26 was the fifth edition of Ireland's premier cup competition, The Football Association of Ireland Challenge Cup or FAI Cup. The tournament began on 9 January 1926 and concluded on 17 March with the final held at Dalymount Park, Dublin. An official attendance of 25,000 people watched inspirational goalkeeper Bill O'Hagan guide Fordsons to their first and only FAI Cup title by defeating the defending champions Shamrock Rovers.

First round

Second round

Semi-finals

Replay

Final

Notes
A.  From 1923-1936, the FAI Cup was known as the Free State Cup.

B.  Attendances were calculated using gate receipts which limited their accuracy as a large proportion of people, particularly children, attended football matches in Ireland throughout the 20th century for free by a number of means. However, in the instances of capacity crowds attending, this practice might not have been as common as usual or have had as large an effect on actual attendances.

C.  The official attendance of 25,000 was a record for the first five FAI Cup finals and the joint highest official attendance for the first ten.

References
General

External links
FAI Website

1925-26
1925–26 in Irish association football
FAI Cup